Taleh Zar may refer to:
 Taleh Zar-e Olya
 Taleh Zar-e Sofla